Dracula is a drama-horror television serial developed by Mark Gatiss and Steven Moffat, based on the 1897 novel of the same name by Bram Stoker. The series, consisting of three episodes, premiered on 1 January 2020 and was broadcast over three consecutive days on BBC One before releasing on Netflix. Claes Bang stars as the title character.

Premise
The series follows Dracula from his origins in Eastern Europe to his battles with Van Helsing's descendants and beyond. Netflix's description reads: "The Count Dracula legend transforms with new tales that flesh out the vampire's gory crimes—and bring his vulnerability into the light."

Cast

Episodes

Production

Development
Development on Dracula began in June 2017, with Mark Gatiss and Steven Moffat reuniting to write the episodes. In October 2018, the series was officially commissioned by the BBC, to air on BBC One and Netflix. Claes Bang was set to star as the eponymous Dracula in November 2018. According to the writers, Dracula in their version is "the hero of his own story" – the central focus of the narrative and main character, rather than a shadowy villain for more traditional heroes to overcome. As with their TV series Sherlock, they aimed to make their version of Dracula both faithful and faithless at the same time, taking details from the original novel, adding "a lot of new stuff" [that was not in the novel] and ignoring some passages from it.

While the series includes a scene in which it is implied that Dracula and Harker have sex, Moffat has said that it is not correct to describe their interpretation of Dracula as bisexual: "He's bi-homicidal, it's not the same thing. He's killing them, not dating them." He also added: "He's not actually having sex with anyone. He's drinking their blood."

Casting
In February 2019, John Heffernan, Dolly Wells, Joanna Scanlan, Morfydd Clark and Lujza Richter joined the cast, with Gatiss also set to appear in the series. In April, Jonathan Aris, Sacha Dhawan, Nathan Stewart-Jarrett, Catherine Schell, Youssef Kerkour and Clive Russell joined the cast with Jonny Campbell, Damon Thomas and Paul McGuigan announced as directors.

Filming
Moffat revealed filming on the series had begun on 4 March 2019. Filming took place at Orava Castle, Banská Štiavnica and Zuberec in Slovakia and at Bray Studios in Berkshire. Filming was completed on 1 August 2019.

Title sequence
The title sequence was made by Peter Anderson Studio. In 2021 it was nominated for a BAFTA at the British Academy Television Craft Awards in the category "Television Craft – Titles & Graphic Identity".

Release

Broadcast
Dracula premiered on BBC One on 1 January 2020, and was broadcast over three consecutive days. The three episodes were released on Netflix on 4 January 2020. The documentary In Search of Dracula, with Mark Gatiss exploring the legacy of the famous Count, aired alongside the series on BBC Two on 3 January. The overnight ratings for the three episodes were 3.60 million, 2.85 million, and 2.70 million respectively.

Marketing
To mark the series premiere, BBC Creative and Talon Outdoor constructed billboards stabbed with wooden stakes that would cast a shadow of the Count after sunset, and below the billboards was a stake inside a case with the label "In case of vampires - break glass". These billboards were put up on Brixton Road in London and Upper Dean Street in Birmingham. The billboards won a number of awards and £100,000 worth of media space for the creators at the 2020 Outdoor Media Awards organised by Clear Channel UK in partnership with Campaign.

Reception

Critical reception

The series was met with positive reviews. On Rotten Tomatoes, the series garnered a 71% approval and an average rating of 7.2/10 from 55 critic reviews. The website's critical consensus reads, "A delicious blend of horror and humor that more-or-less balances modern sensibilities and the character's beloved legacy, Dracula is a frighteningly fun — if not always faithful — time." Metacritic assigned the series a score of 75 out of 100, based on 8 reviews, signifying "generally favorable reviews".

Accolades

Future
In February 2020, Bang expressed his interest in a second series. Gatiss said "Apparently if you pour blood onto Dracula's ashes he comes back. Who knows? Dracula tends to come back, that's what vampires do – but we have no idea [if the show will return]."

References

External links
 
 
 

2020 British television series debuts
2020 British television series endings
2020s British drama television series
2020s British television miniseries
BBC Television shows
Television series by Hartswood Films
British horror fiction television series
Dark fantasy television series
Dracula television shows
English-language Netflix original programming
Television series set in 2020
Television series set in the 1890s
Television shows set in London
Works set in castles
Television shows filmed in Slovakia
Television series by BBC Studios